The Autopista AP-68 (also AP-68, Autopista Vasco-Aragonesa or Autopista del Ebro) is a Spanish autopista route.  It connects Zaragoza with Bilbao via Tudela, Calahorra and Logroño. The entirety of the route forms the entirety of the European route E804, a B class road in the International E-road Network.

AP-68 / E 804 begins in Bilbao, Spain, passes by Logroño, and ends in Zaragoza, following the path of the Autopista/Autovia 68.  

It has junctions with Autovía A-2, Autovía A-15, Autovía A-1 and ends at the Autovía A-8.

The highway begins in link 22 of the AP-8 (E-70) and ends on link 318 of the A-2 (E-90) (Autovía del Nordeste). Built between 1974 and 1979, its length is about 295 km. Until 2003, this highway was known as A-68.

Concession expiry
In 2000, the José María Aznar government, the PP, extended the highway concession that expired in 2011 up to 2026, making its recovery impossible, as it was strongly criticized by the Aragon regions and the Basque Country, then governed by PSOE-Aragon and PNV, respectively. In exchange for the extension of the concession, certain tolls became cheaper. The closing date of the award is November 10, 2026.

Subsidized tolls
The highway concessionaire has signed agreements with the Government of La Rioja and the Regional Government of Aragón to enable certain routes free of charge, provided the VIA-T device is used.

For journeys between the Cenicero (10) links and Agoncillo (13), inclusive, and intermediate, tolls are free for users of VIA-T.

Since February 1, 2008, light vehicles that perform return trips within a 24-hour period on any route between the Haro (9) links and Alfaro (16), inclusive, and intermediate, tolls are free for users of VIA-T. Until that date only the toll for the return trip was free, under the same conditions.

Since February 1, 2009, if a return trip is made between the Gallur (19) and Zaragoza (23) links in a 24-hour period, light vehicles are free where the same route is taken for the outward and return journey and the same VIA-T device is used.

In the Basque section a social toll is applied, only to citizens registered in Álava, with discounts for those taking more than 25 trips per month.

Traffic

Exit list

Route

 Bilbao - Miranda de Ebro - Logroño - Zaragoza (Towards )

References

External links 
 UN Economic Commission for Europe: Overall Map of E-road Network (2007)
 International E-road network

899804
E804
E804
Autopistas and autovías in Spain
Transport in Aragon
Transport in Navarre
Transport in La Rioja (Spain)